Mariya Panfilova (née Mariya Sadilova) (born October 11, 1987) is a retired biathlete, represented Russia (2007–2012), Ukraine (2013–2014, 2017–2018), and Belarus (2015–2017).

Performances

(Rus) – representing Russia; (Ukr) – representing Ukraine

World Cup

Podiums

Positions

References

External links
 Profile on biathlon.com.ua
 
 Profile in BiathlonRusBase

1987 births
Living people
Ukrainian female biathletes
Russian female biathletes
Olympic biathletes of Ukraine
Biathletes at the 2014 Winter Olympics
Russian emigrants to Ukraine
Naturalized citizens of Ukraine
Belarusian female biathletes
Ukrainian emigrants to Belarus
Naturalized citizens of Belarus
Belarusian emigrants to Ukraine
Sportspeople from Perm, Russia
Universiade gold medalists for Russia
Universiade medalists in biathlon
Competitors at the 2011 Winter Universiade